Nilay Deniz (born 3 May 1993) is a Turkish actress.

Life and career 
Nilay Deniz was born in 1993 in Aydın. After studying acting, she made her television debut in 2010 with a role in the Behzat Ç. series. She continued her career with recurring roles in series such as Ah Neriman, Güneşi Beklerken, 20 Dakika, Mor Menekşeler and Hayata Beş Kala.

Her breakthrough came with Aşk Yeniden, in which she had a leading role. In 2017, she had the main role in Ateşböceği, portraying the character of Aslı. She then appeared in a supporting role in the Kalk Gidelim series as Nehir. In 2020, she was cast in Kanal D's romantic comedy series Çatı Katı Aşk, playing the role of Yasemin.

Filmography

References

External links 
 
 

1993 births
Living people
Turkish television actresses
Turkish voice actresses
21st-century Turkish actresses